The 1980 Brisbane Rugby League premiership was the 73rd season of Brisbane's semi-professional rugby league football competition. Eight teams from across Brisbane competed for the premiership, which culminated in a grand final match between the Northern Suburbs and Southern Suburbs clubs.

Season summary 
Teams played each other three times, with 21 rounds of competition played. It resulted in a top four of Southern Suburbs, Fortitude Valley, Northern Suburbs and Past Brothers.

Teams

Finals

Grand Final 
The Grand Final, attended by over 32,000 people, was most notable for a fight which occurred in the first half of the match. Spectators cheered while a commentator was quoted as saying "that's as bad as I've seen in a Grand Final." When play resumed, a close game finished with Norths winning 17-15.

Northern Suburbs 17 (Tries: R. Henrick, B. Dunn, P. Dutton. Goals: G. Warnock 4.)

Southern Suburbs 15 (Tries: M. Meninga, G. Moroko, B. Johnstone. Goals: M. Meninga 3.)

References

Rugby league in Brisbane
Brisbane Rugby League season